Season one of Ples sa zvezdama premiered on March 29, 2014. Ten pairs participated. Milojko Pantić and Tamara Paunović were confirmed by Prva on March 9, 2014, while Lena Bogdanović and Niggor were confirmed two days later. On March 12, 2014, Prva announced that Saša Vidić and Katarina Šišmanović will also be in the competition. Nikolija Jovanović and Ivan Mihailović were announced on March 13, 2014. On March 14, 2014, Prva said actress Tanja Bošković will also be in the competition. Prva announced four judges: Nikola Mandić, Marija Prelević, Aleksandar Josipović and Konstantin Kostjukov. Milan Kalinić and Tanja Petrović were announced on March 18, 2014. Last announced contestant was Aleksandar Šapić, former water polo player and politician, who was announced on March 19, 2014. It was said that 12 contestants will be competing, but on March 20, 2014, Prva confirmed that Vanesa Šokčić and Nikola Nemešević – Nemeš will also be in the show.

Couples

Rules 
The contestant pairs consist of a celebrity paired with a professional dancer. Past celebrity contestants include professional and Olympic athletes, supermodels, actors and singers. Each couple performs predetermined dances and competes against the others for judges' points and audience votes. The couple receiving the lowest combined total of judges' points and audience votes is eliminated each week until only the champion dance pair remains. Every pair has to dance following dances: cha-cha-cha, jive, foxtrot, samba, rumba, tango, pasodoble, quickstep, waltz and Viennese Waltz.

Scoring chart
Red numbers indicate the couples with the lowest score for each week.
Green numbers indicate the couples with the highest score for each week.
 indicates the couple (or couples) eliminated that week.
 indicates the winning couple.
 indicates the runner-up couple.
 indicates the third-place couple.
 the returning couple finishing in the bottom two (or three)
 the couple withdrew from the competition
 the couple had immunity that week

Weekly scores
Unless indicated otherwise, individual judges scores in the charts below (given in parentheses) are listed in this order from left to right: Aleksandar Josipović, Marija Prelević, Nikola Mandić, Konstantin Kostjukov.

Week 1
Music guest: Željko Samardžić
 
Running order

After last couple finished dancing, every couple had to dance Viennese Waltz for 30 seconds. Marija Prelević gave score in the name of the judges (from 1 to 10). These points were added to points from the first dance, and they got the final result. All points were later made into points from 1 to 14 (couple with the biggest score got 14 points, and couple with the lowest score got 1 point).

Week 2

Running order

After last couple finished dancing, every couple had to dance bachata for 30 seconds. Marija Prelević gave score in the name of the judges (from 1 to 10). These points were added to points from the first dance, and they got the final result. All points were later made into points from 1 to 14 (couple with the biggest score got 14 points, and couple with the lowest score got 1 point).

Week 3
Music guest: Sergej Ćetković
Running order

After last couple finished dancing, every couple had to dance cha-cha-cha for 30 seconds. Marija Prelević gave score in the name of the judges (from 1 to 10). These points were added to points from the first dance, and they got the final result. All points were later made into points from 1 to 14 (couple with the biggest score got 14 points, and couple with the lowest score got 1 point).

Week 4
Music guest: Vlado Georgiev
Running order

After last couple finished dancing, every couple had to dance quickstep for 30 seconds. Marija Prelević gave score in the name of the judges (from 1 to 10). These points were added to points from the first dance, and they got the final result. All points were later made into points from 1 to 14 (couple with the biggest score got 14 points, and couple with the lowest score got 1 point).

Week 5: Serbian Folk Music Night
Running order

At the beginning of the show, Milan Kalinić announced that he was advised to withdraw from the competition due to a problem with his left leg.

After last couple finished dancing, every couple had to dance Viennese Waltz for 30 seconds. Marija Prelević gave score in the name of the judges (from 1 to 10). These points were added to points from the first dance, and they got the final result. All points were later made into points from 1 to 14 (couple with the biggest score got 14 points, and couple with the lowest score got 1 point).

Week 6: Movie Night
Running order

Lena's partner, Nikola, hurt his leg while they were rehearsing their dance, so Lena got new partner for this week - Mirko Knežević, who was eliminated in second week.

When all couples finished dancing, it was announced that every couple will be dancing tango at the same time. Judges were eliminating couples one by one. First eliminated couple got 1 point, second eliminated couple got 2 points, etc. Winners were Tanja B. & Marko who got 8 points.

Week 7: Love Night
Wednesday: Individual judges scores in the chart below (given in parentheses) are listed in this order from left to right: Radoš Bajić, Marija Prelević, Nikola Mandić, Duška Jovanić. 
Sunday: Individual judges scores in the chart below (given in parentheses) are listed in this order from left to right: Aleksandar Josipović, Marija Prelević, Nikola Mandić, Konstantin Kostjukov.

Running order

Due to floods in Serbia, there were no episodes on 18 and 25 May. It was later announced that there will be two episodes in week 7 - one on 28 May (Wednesday) and other one on 1 June (Sunday). This means there will be a double elimination this week. Lena's partner, Nikola Tomašević, announced that he must left the show due to a problem with his leg. Nikola Knežević, who was Lena's partner in the previous episode, came back and announced he will be her new partner.

Wednesday 
After every pair finished their dance, it was announced that pair with most points (Tanja P. & Marko) will get an immunity. It was also announced that there will be a special challenge. Three pairs with most points (Niggor & Jelena, Ivan & Marija and Tanja B. & Marko) were able to choose their dance duel partners (Aleksandar & Slađana, Vanesa & Vlada and Lena & Mirko), but dance duel partners were able to choose a dance (disco, rumba and samba). Niggor & Jelena chose Aleksandar & Slađana, Ivan & Marija chose Lena & Mirko and Tanja B. & Marko chose Vanesa & Vlada. Winner was chosen by judges. Winning pair gets 3 points, while losers get nothing. Aleksandar & Slađana chose disco, but Niggor & Jelena won 3 points. Lena & Mirko chose samba and won 3 points. Vanesa & Vlada chose rumba, but Tanja B. & Marko won 3 points.

Sunday 
After every pair finished their dance, it was announced that there will be a team dance competition. There were two teams. Highest placed pairs from Wednesday show (Tanja P. & Marko and Niggor & Jelena) chose their team partners. Tanja P. & Marko, Tanja B. & Marko and Ivan & Marija were Team Finalists, while Niggor & Jelena, Aleksandar & Slađana and Vanesa & Vlada were Team Congratulations. Each team would be scored by judges (from 1 to 10). These points were later added to members of the team. Team Finalists won 39 points (10, 10, 9, 10), while Team Congratulations won 38 points (10, 9, 9, 10).

Week 8
Running order

Dance chart 
The celebrities and professional partners danced one routine for each corresponding week.

 Highest scoring dance
 Lowest scoring dance
 Not performed or scored

References 

 
2014 Serbian television seasons